USS Oneida has been the name of more than one United States Navy ship, and may refer to:

 , a brig commissioned in 1810, sold in 1815, repurchased, and sold again in 1825
 , a screw sloop of war in commission from 1862 to 1865 and from 1867 until wrecked in 1870
 , a patrol vessel in commission from April to September 1898 and during September 1912 and in commission as USS Henry P. Williams (SP-509) and USS SP-509 in 1918–1919
 , the proposed name and designation of a yacht considered for use as a patrol vessel during World War I but never acquired by the Navy
 , a patrol vessel in commission from 1918 to 1919
 , an attack transport in commission from 1944 to 1946

United States Navy ship names